Maxillaria, abbreviated as Max in the horticultural trade, is a large genus of orchids (family Orchidaceae). This is a diverse genus, with very different morphological forms. Their characteristics can vary widely.
They are commonly called spider orchids, flame orchids or tiger orchids. Their scientific name is derived from the Latin word maxilla, meaning jawbone, reflecting on the column and the base of the lip of some species, that may evoke a protruding jaw.

Recent molecular studies have found Maxillaria as it has long been viewed to be an unnatural hodgepodge composed of groups not closely related to each other. Hence it has been proposed that the genus should be split into several genera, proposals that have been gaining acceptance. Some of the species long considered members of Maxillaria have been moved to other genera: Camaridium, Heterotaxis, Ornithidium, Brasiliorchis, Christensonella, Nitidibulbon, Sauvetrea, Inti, Mapinguari, Maxillariella, Rhetinantha, Mormolyca.

Distribution and ecology

Maxillaria species still included in the smaller version of the genus are distributed in the rainforest at sea level to elevations of 3,500 m, in Latin America from central Mexico to Bolivia, as well as in the West Indies. This is an indication for the different temperature requirements, from warm growing to cold growing, within the genus.

They are mostly epiphytes, rather large in size, but some are terrestrials or even lithophytes (such as M. rupestris).

Many species are rather large with rampant growth.

Characteristics 
Their pseudobulbs are round or oblong and each carry one or two lanceolate leaves. Some grow close together in a clustered manner on a short rhizome, while in other species the pseudobulbs keep some distance on an elongate rhizome. This rhizome is clothed in a somewhat transparent, silvery-gray velamen.

The flowers grow solitary on short stalks, called scapes, from the base of the pseudobulb. Most are small to very small, but some species carry large, showy flowers. The flowers are never longer than the leaves. Their free petals and sepals have a typically curved and adnate labellum with three inconspicuous lobes. Or the lip may have a distinct callus on the disc ( = central part of the lip from which the lobes radiate). The papillae (= small warts like glands) and the trichomes of the lip show great diversity. The most common form for the papillae is the conical form with rounded or pointed tips.

Cultivation 
Maxillaria is not one of the popular genera among growers. Only a few species grow big, showy flowers. But some species are nevertheless sought by collectors, mostly for the fragrance of their blossoms, such as Maxillaria tenuifolia.

References 

Dr. Karlheinz Senghas - Maxillaria, un genre chaotique - Richardiana
Eric A. Christenson - Vue d’ensemble du genre Maxillaria - Richardiana

External links 

 
Maxillariinae genera
Epiphytic orchids